The Nanomantidae are a new (2019) family of praying mantises, based on the type genus Nanomantis.  As part of a major revision of mantid taxonomy, genera and tribes have been moved here, substantially replacing the old family Iridopterygidae.

The new placement is in superfamily Nanomantoidea (of group Cernomantodea) and infraorder Schizomantodea.  The recorded distribution of genera includes: Africa including Madagascar, the Himalayas, SE Asia through to Australia and Pacific islands.

Subfamilies, tribes and selected genera  
The Mantodea Species File lists four subfamilies:

Fulciniinae 
 tribe Fulciniini
 Calofulcinia Giglio-Tos, 1915
 Fulcinia Stal, 1877
 Hedigerella Werner, 1933
 Ima Tindale, 1924
 Machairima Beier, 1965
 Nannofulcinia Beier, 1965
 Papugalepsus Werner, 1928
 Pilomantis Giglio-Tos, 1915
 Tylomantis Westwood, 1889
 tribe Neomantini
 Kongobatha Hebard, 1920
 Neomantis Giglio-Tos, 1915
 tribe Paraoxypilini (Australasia, Oceania):
 subtribe Bolbina
 Bolbe Stal, 1877
 Papubolbe Beier, 1965
 subtribe Paraoxypilina
 Cliomantis Giglio-Tos, 1913
 Exparoxypilus Beier, 1929
 Gyromantis Giglio-Tos, 1913
 Metoxypilus Giglio-Tos, 1913
 Myrmecomantis Giglio-Tos, 1913
 Nesoxypilus Beier, 1965
 Paraoxypilus Saussure, 1870
 Phthersigena Stal, 1871
 tribe Stenomantini
 Ciulfina Giglio-Tos, 1915
 Fulciniola Giglio-Tos, 1915 
 Stenomantis Saussure, 1871

Hapalomantinae 
 tribe Hapalomantini: mainland Africa - genera:
 Bolbena Giglio-Tos, 1915
 Bolbula Giglio-Tos, 1915
 Hapalogymnes Kaltenbach, 1996
 Hapalomantis Saussure, 1871
 tribe Nilomantini: Madagascar
 Chloromantis Kaltenbach, 1998
 Cornucollis Brannoch & Svenson, 2016
 Enicophlebia Westwood, 1889
 Hyalomantis Giglio-Tos, 1915
 Ilomantis Giglio-Tos, 1915
 Melomantis Giglio-Tos, 1915
 Negromantis Giglio-Tos, 1915
 Nilomantis Werner, 1907
 Platycalymma Westwood, 1889

Nanomantinae 
 Miromantis Giglio-Tos, 1927
 Nanomantis Saussure, 1871
 Ormomantis Giglio-Tos, 1915
 Oxymantis Werner, 1931
 Parananomantis Mukherjee, 1995
 Sceptuchus Hebard, 1920

Tropidomantinae
 tribe Epsomantini 
 Epsomantis Giglio-Tos, 1915 
 tribe Tropidomantini
 Eomantis Giglio-Tos, 1915
 Oligocanthopus Beier, 1935
 Pliacanthopus Giglio-Tos, 1927
 Sinomantis Beier, 1933
 Tropidomantis Stal, 1877

References

External links 

Mantodea families
Nanomantidae